Johnny O'Connell (born July 24, 1962) is the most successful GM factory racing driver from the United States.  He currently drives for Cadillac in the Pirelli World Challenge, winning the 2012, 2013, 2014 and 2015 GT driver's championship.

Career

Born in Poughkeepsie, New York, O'Connell started racing in the Formula Atlantic series in 1987, winning the Championship and Rookie of the Year.  He also spent 1996 in the Indy Racing League, racing in the Indianapolis 500 and finishing in the top 10 in half of his 4 starts.  He has seven class wins in the 12 Hours of Sebring, more than any other driver, and an overall title in 1994 when racing for Nissan.  Driving for Corvette Racing, he has also won a number of class victories at the 24 Hours of Le Mans and the 24 Hours of Daytona.  With his teammate Ron Fellows he won the 2003 GTS class driver's championship.

O'Connell was also featured in Chevy's 2007, Super Bowl ad, "Ain't We Got Love" also featuring Mary J. Blige, rapper T.I., Big & Rich, and Dale Earnhardt Jr.

In 2013, O'Connell competed in the Johnsonville Sausage 200 at Road America in the NASCAR Nationwide Series for JR Motorsports, driving the No. 5 Chevrolet Camaro; he finished 12th in the event.

Motorsports career results

NASCAR
(key) (Bold – Pole position awarded by qualifying time. Italics – Pole position earned by points standings or practice time. * – Most laps led.)

Nationwide Series

 Ineligible for series points

24 Hours of Le Mans results

Indy Racing League results
(key) (Races in bold indicate pole position)

Indy 500 results

Heritage 
The O'Connell family, principally of Derrynane, are a Gaelic Irish noble family of County Kerry in Munster. O'Connell comes from the Irish word "O'Conaill," meaning 'strong as a wolf'. Johnny O'Connell is related by blood to the Belanger Family, including Jackson Belanger.

References

External links

 
 

Living people
1962 births
Sportspeople from Poughkeepsie, New York
Racing drivers from New York (state)
24 Hours of Le Mans drivers
24 Hours of Daytona drivers
American Le Mans Series drivers
IndyCar Series drivers
Indianapolis 500 drivers
Indy Lights drivers
Atlantic Championship drivers
SCCA Formula Super Vee drivers
NASCAR drivers
Trans-Am Series drivers
12 Hours of Sebring drivers
FIA GT Championship drivers
DAMS drivers
A. J. Foyt Enterprises drivers
Corvette Racing drivers
David Price Racing drivers
JR Motorsports drivers
Nürburgring 24 Hours drivers